William David Mudd (2 June 1933 – 28 April 2020) was a British politician.

Mudd was born in Falmouth, Cornwall, in June 1933. He was educated at Truro Cathedral School and was a member of the Tavistock Urban District Council from 1959 to 1961.  He carried out his National service on merchant ships in the 1950s and, after working for a brief period as a stage manager in ballrooms all over the UK, he decided to take on a career in radio and television broadcast journalism.

He was Conservative MP for Falmouth and Camborne from 1970 until 1992, when he stood down. It was considered a surprise when he decided to stand in his old constituency at the 2005 general election as an independent candidate. He came fifth with 2% of the vote.

In the 1970s, Mudd was a member of Mebyon Kernow as well as the Conservative Party. He was also a newsreader on Westward Television in the 1970s and a Cornish bard.

He died in Derriford Hospital, Plymouth, Devon in April 2020 at the age of 86.

References

Times Guide to the House of Commons 1987, BBC news website

External links
Mr David Mudd: speeches in Parliament Hansard 1803-2005

1933 births
2020 deaths
Conservative Party (UK) MPs for English constituencies
Independent politicians in England
Members of the Parliament of the United Kingdom for constituencies in Cornwall
People educated at Truro Cathedral School
Politicians from Cornwall
UK MPs 1970–1974
UK MPs 1974
UK MPs 1974–1979
UK MPs 1979–1983
UK MPs 1983–1987
UK MPs 1987–1992
Bards of Gorsedh Kernow